William Douglas Penneck Hill (1884 – 9 April 1962) was a British Indologist, a scholar of King's College, Cambridge, former assistant master at Eton and principal of Jay Narayan's High School Benares. He is noted for his English commentary and scholarly translation of the Bhagavad Gita.

Biography
He was born in 1884 in London, England. In 1928 he translated the Bhagavad Gita into English. He died on 9 April 1962 in Poole, Dorset, England.

Review
W. Douglas P. Hill, who in 1928 gave us the most outstanding English rendering of the text, was quite conscious of the difference between good and bad translations. He noted in his "Bibliographical Notes" that in the eighteen eighties and nineties the Bhagavadgītā had become "the playground of western pseudo-mystics." He did not appreciate the attempts that he grouped together as "Theosophical Versions"; he referred to the greater part of other works on the Gītā as comparatively worthless," and he added: "Hundreds of vernacular editions have found a home in the Indian Office Library, and still continue to encumber its reluctant shelves."
– Kees W. Bolle

References

Further reading 
Growse F. S. (1978). The Rāmāyaṇa of Tulasīdāsa. Motilal Banarsidass. p. xxiv
Preciado-Solís, Benjamín (1984). The Kṛṣṇa Cycle in the Purāṇas: Themes and Motifs in a Heroic Saga. Motilal Banarsidass. p. 25. 
Sharma, Arvind (2003). The Study of Hinduism. University of South Carolina Press. p. 177.
Zaehner, R. C. (1969). The Bhagavad-gītā. Oxford University Press. p. 1.

Reviews of Hill's translation of, and commentary on, the Gita 
 Barnett, L. (1929). Indica by L. D. Barnett – 1. The Bhagavadgītā. Translated from the Sanskrit with an introduction, an argument, and a commentary, by Hill W. Douglas P. M.A. 9 × 6, pp. x 303. London, Oxford printed: Oxford University Press, 1928. Journal of the Royal Asiatic Society of Great Britain & Ireland, 61(1), 125–130. doi:10.1017/S0035869X00061694
 Charpentier, Jarl (1928). The Bhagavadgita, translated from the Sanskrit, with an Introduction, an Argument and a Commentary by W. Douglas P. Hill, Indian Antiquary, Volume 59, p19
 Randle, H. N. (1929). The Bhagavadgītā. Translated from the Sanskrit with an Introduction and Argument and a Commentary by W. Douglas P. Hill. pp. 12, 303. London: Oxford University Press, 1928".  Bulletin of the School of Oriental and African Studies. 5 (03): 638.

External links 

W. Douglas P. Hill at MLBD
W. Douglas P. Hill at Google Books

British Indologists
British Sanskrit scholars
Translators of the Bhagavad Gita
People associated with the University of Cambridge
1884 births
1962 deaths
Academics from London
20th-century translators